Charles Maurice Graham (1834–1912) was a British clergyman who held high office in the Roman Catholic Church.

Life
Graham was born 5 April 1834 at Mhow, India. He was educated at Sacred Heart College at Prior Park and the English College, Rome. He was ordained in 1857, and two years later became secretary to the bishop and treasurer of the Diocese of Plymouth.

He was appointed Coadjutor Bishop of Plymouth and Titular Bishop of Cisamus on 25 September 1891, and succeeded as diocesan Bishop of Plymouth on 25 October 1902. He retired on 16 March 1911 and took the title Bishop of Tiberias in partibus. He died in Hayle, Cornwall on 2 September 1912.

Bishop Graham wrote the article on the "Diocese of Plymouth" for the Catholic Encyclopedia.

References

External links

1834 births
1912 deaths
19th-century Roman Catholic bishops in England
20th-century Roman Catholic bishops in England
Roman Catholic bishops of Plymouth
Contributors to the Catholic Encyclopedia
British people in colonial India